Theodosia is a mountain village of Kilkis in Central Macedonia in altitude 680 meters, located on the slopes of Mount Mavrovouni (part of Kroussia Mountains ), located 28.5 km . D. of the city of Kilkis and 49.5 km NW-NE. of Thessaloniki . The old name of the village, from the time of Ottoman rule, was Hatzi Bairamli or Hatzimbairamli and it is mentioned in 1918 in the Government Gazette 152A-09/07/1918 that the seat of the homonymous community that belonged to the prefecture of Thessaloniki was defined . It was renamed Theodosia in 1927 and in 1935 was detached to the prefecture of Kilkis. According to the Kallikratis plan of 2010, it is the local community of Theodosia that belongs to the municipal unit of Kroussa of the municipality of Kilkis and according to the 2011 census as a community has a population of 229 permanent residents, while as a settlement 128.

References

Populated places in Kilkis (regional unit)